Hershey FC is an American soccer club based in Hershey, Pennsylvania, United States. The club was founded in 2012 to play in the Keystone Conference of the National Premier Soccer League (NPSL), a national amateur league at the fourth tier of the American soccer pyramid.

The team plays some home games at Hersheypark Stadium. The club colors are navy blue and orange.

History
Hershey FC joined the National Premier Soccer League (NPSL), considered the fourth tier of the American soccer pyramid and roughly equal to the USL Premier Development League (PDL), to begin play in the 2013 season. The team represents the top level of the Hershey Soccer Club youth soccer organization. The Panthers played their first game on May 11, 2013, defeating FC Reading Revolution 3-1 in an away match. The Panthers would finish in 5th place of the Keystone Conference in their first season.

Year-by-year

Staff

Head coach
 Ian Carter (2013–present)

Assistant coaches
 Adam Clay

References

National Premier Soccer League teams
2013 establishments in Pennsylvania
Soccer clubs in Pennsylvania
Association football clubs established in 2013
Hershey, Pennsylvania